Lintneria praelongus is a moth of the  family Sphingidae.

Distribution 
It is known from Honduras and Guatemala.

Description 
It is similar to Lintneria istar but more greyish white and the forewings are more elongate.

Biology 
The larvae probably feed on Lamiaceae (such as Salvia, Mentha, Monarda and Hyptis), Hydrophylloideae (such as Wigandia) and Verbenaceae species (such as Verbena and Lantana).

References

Lintneria
Moths described in 1903